The Kernavė Mounds (Kernavė hillforts) are five hillforts at the southern edge of Kernavė (Širvintos District, Aukštaitija Lithuania) in the Pajauta Valley on the right bank of Neris. Kernavė is the oldest known (but not the first) capital of Grand Duchy of Lithuania. It includes the following mounds:

See also
List of hillforts in Lithuania

References

Hill forts in Lithuania